Gordoville is a village in Cape Giradeau County, Missouri, United States. The population was 625 at the 2020 census. It is part of the Cape Girardeau–Jackson, MO-IL Metropolitan Statistical Area.

Etymology
Gordonville was named after Sam Gordon, who established a watermill on the same site where the Gordonville Milling Company operated.

History
The land around present-day Gordonville was originally owned by Sam Gordon and his father, who lived in Indiana.  Sam Gordon established the first store in the town in either 1857 or 1858, and the town became known as Gordonville.  The first church in the town was set up by Methodist missionaries on the farm of Louis Siemers in 1848, with Liberty School house being established shortly later.  Hubble Mill and Gordonville Roller Mills were established along Hubble Creek.

In the 1850s, German immigrants began to move into the area and established farms around Gordonville.  A German Methodist church and a German Lutheran church were also organized just south of Gordonville to serve the local German population.

Geography
Gordonville is located along Hubble Creek at  (37.312237, -89.674245).

Demographics

2010 census
As of the census of 2010, there were 391 people, 157 households, and 124 families living in the village. The racial makeup of the village was 99.23% White, 0.26% Black or African American, and 0.51% from two or more races. Hispanic or Latino of any race were 0.51% of the population.

There were 157 households, of which 28.7% had children under the age of 18 living with them, 72.6% were married couples living together, 3.8% had a female householder with no husband present, 2.5% had a male householder with no wife present, and 21.0% were non-families. 19.7% of all households were made up of individuals, and 8.3% had someone living alone who was 65 years of age or older. The average household size was 2.48 and the average family size was 2.81.

The median age in the village was 46.5 years. 17.4% of residents were under the age of 18; 8% were between the ages of 18 and 24; 21.7% were from 25 to 44; 36% were from 45 to 64; and 16.9% were 65 years of age or older. The gender makeup of the village was 49.1% male and 50.9% female.

2000 census
As of the census of 2000, there were 425 people, 154 households, and 129 families living in the village. The racial makeup of the village was 98.59% White, 0.94% Native American, and 0.47% from two or more races. Hispanic or Latino of any race were 0.24% of the population.

There were 154 households, out of which 39.6% had children under the age of 18 living with them, 77.9% were married couples living together, 4.5% had a female householder with no husband present, and 15.6% were non-families. 13.6% of all households were made up of individuals, and 8.4% had someone living alone who was 65 years of age or older. The average household size was 2.76 and the average family size was 3.03.

In the village, the population was spread out, with 27.1% under the age of 18, 6.8% from 18 to 24, 27.3% from 25 to 44, 24.9% from 45 to 64, and 13.9% who were 65 years of age or older. The median age was 40 years. For every 100 females, there were 88.1 males. For every 100 females age 18 and over, there were 92.5 males.

The median income for a household in the village was $53,125, and the median income for a family was $57,375. Males had a median income of $35,341 versus $17,917 for females. The per capita income for the village was $20,763. About 1.6% of families and 3.9% of the population were below the poverty line, including 6.8% of those under age 18 and 3.6% of those age 65 or over.

Education
It is in the Jackson R-2 School District, which operates Jackson High School.

Notable people
 Henry F. Gerecke, Lutheran minister and United States Army chaplain
 Fred Henry McGuire, United States Navy  sailor and receipt of the Medal of Honor

References

Villages in Cape Girardeau County, Missouri
Cape Girardeau–Jackson metropolitan area
Villages in Missouri